Eddie Solomon Jr. (February 9, 1951 – January 12, 1986), nicknamed "Buddy J," was an American right-handed pitcher in Major League Baseball who appeared in 191 games for six teams between 1973 and 1982. During his career, he toiled for the Los Angeles Dodgers, Chicago Cubs, St. Louis Cardinals, Atlanta Braves, Pittsburgh Pirates and Chicago White Sox.

Solomon went undrafted in 1969 and signed with the Dodgers as a free-agent amateur. After five seasons in the club's farm system, he was given his first MLB trial in September . But he appeared in only eight games over two seasons as a Dodger, and was included, with Geoff Zahn, in the impactful May 2, 1975, trade in which Los Angeles acquired Burt Hooton from the Cubs. His Chicago stay was also brief, with only six MLB games pitched in  before he was dealt to the Cardinals' organization. The  season saw Solomon's first extended tenure in the majors, when he appeared in 26 games for the Cards, 24 of them in relief. But when  began, Solomon found himself back in the minor leagues. He was traded for the third time in three seasons when St. Louis shipped him to the Braves on May 24. After he spent more time in Triple-A, the Braves recalled him in July, and gave Solomon his first opportunity as a starting pitcher; appearing in 18 games, 16 as a starter, he compiled a 6–6 won–lost record for a team that would lose 101 games. Still, he struggled in the won–lost column, going 7–14 and finishing fifth in the National League in games lost.

The transaction set up Solomon's two most successful seasons in the majors. However,  brought misfortune: Solomon was ineffective in 11 appearances with the Pirates through June 2, then traded to the White Sox on June 14. Solomon worked out of the ChiSox bullpen for six games, and won his only decision, but he was handed his unconditional release on July 2. He retired from minor league baseball after the 1983 season.

As a big leaguer, Solomon posted a 36–42 career won–lost mark with a 4.00 earned run average in 191 games, almost evenly split between starts (96) and relief appearances (95). He posted eight career complete games (with no shutouts) and four saves. In 718 innings pitched he gave up 764 hits and 247 bases on balls, with 337 strikeouts.

Slightly more than two years after his final pro season, Solomon died in a one-car accident in Macon, Georgia, on January 12, 1986, at age 34.

References

External links

1951 births
1986 deaths
African-American baseball players
Albuquerque Dukes players
Appleton Foxes players
Atlanta Braves players
Baseball players from Georgia (U.S. state)
Chicago Cubs players
Chicago White Sox players
Columbus Clippers players
Daytona Beach Dodgers players
El Paso Dodgers players
Los Angeles Dodgers players
Major League Baseball pitchers
New Orleans Pelicans (baseball) players
Ogden Dodgers players
People from Perry, Georgia
Pittsburgh Pirates players
Richmond Braves players
Road incident deaths in Georgia (U.S. state)
St. Louis Cardinals players
Tulsa Drillers players
Wichita Aeros players
20th-century African-American sportspeople